Newton Solney is a civil parish in the South Derbyshire district of Derbyshire, England.  The parish contains 19 listed buildings that are recorded in the National Heritage List for England.  Of these, two are listed at Grade II*, the middle of the three grades, and the others are at Grade II, the lowest grade.  The parish contains the village of Newton Solney and the surrounding area.  Most of the listed buildings are houses, cottages and associated structures, farmhouses and farm buildings.  The other listed buildings include a church, follies, a hotel and a public house, a row of almshouses, and part of a model farm.


Key

Buildings

References

Citations

Sources

 

Lists of listed buildings in Derbyshire